Streptomyces fagopyri is a bacterium species from the genus of Streptomyces which has been isolated from rhizosphereic soil of a Fagopyrum dibotrys plant.

See also 
 List of Streptomyces species

References 

fagopyri
Bacteria described in 2020